Wellington USD 353 is a public unified school district headquartered in Wellington, Kansas, United States.  The district includes the communities of Wellington, Mayfield, Perth, Riverdale, Rome, and nearby rural areas.

Schools
The school district operates the following schools:
 Wellington High School
 Wellington Middle School
 Eisenhower Elementary School
 Kennedy Elementary School
 Lincoln Elementary School
 Washington Elementary School

See also
 List of high schools in Kansas
 List of unified school districts in Kansas
 Kansas State Department of Education
 Kansas State High School Activities Association

References

External links
 

School districts in Kansas